The Canal du Mignon is the canalised lower section of the river Mignon in western France. It connects to the Sèvre Niortaise near La Grève-sur-Mignon with its terminus in Mauzé-sur-le-Mignon. It is 11 km long with two locks.

See also
List of canals in France

References

Mignon
Canals opened in 1883